Henry Horton may refer to:

 Henry Hollis Horton (1866–1934), American politician in Tennessee
 Henry Horton (newspaper proprietor) (1870–1943), owner of The New Zealand Herald
 Henry Horton (sportsman) (1923–1998), English cricketer and footballer
 Henry Bishop Horton (1819–1885), American inventor

See also
 Henry Horton State Park, Chapel Hill, Tennessee, United States
 Henry Horton Miller (1861–1916), Canadian politician